Săcășeni (Hungarian pronunciation:  is a commune of 1,297 inhabitants situated in Satu Mare County, Crișana, Romania. It is composed of two villages, Chegea (Kegye) and Săcășeni.

Demographics
Ethnic groups (2002 census): 
Hungarians: 49.21%
Romanians: 38.07%
Romanies (Gypsies): 12.04%

According to mother tongue, 49.51% of the population speak Hungarian as their first language, while 42.70% speak Romanian.

References

Communes in Satu Mare County
Localities in Crișana